O2V may refer to:

 Vanadium(IV) oxide  (O2V; VO2; O2V(IV); V(IV)O2), a chemical compound composed of vanadium and oxygen
 O-type main-sequence star (OV star) of the O2V subtype

See also

 OW (disambiguation)
 OVV (disambiguation)
 OV2 (disambiguation)
 OOV (disambiguation)
 OV (disambiguation)